Megachasma is a genus of sharks. It is usually considered to be the sole genus in the distinct family Megachasmidae, though suggestion has been made that it may belong in the family Cetorhinidae, of which the basking shark is currently the sole extant member. Megachasma is known from a single living species, Megachasma pelagios.

In addition to the living M. pelagios, however, two extinct megamouth species – the Priabonian M. alisonae and the Oligocene–Miocene M. applegatei – have also recently been proposed on the basis of fossilized tooth remains.  An early ancestor of the recent species Megachasma pelagios was reported from the early Miocene (Burdigalian) of Belgium. However, the Cretaceous-aged M. comanchensis has been recently reclassified as an odontaspid shark in the genus Pseudomegachasma, and is in fact unrelated to the megamouth shark despite similar teeth morphology.

They are a very rare genus of shark that are mainly found in temperate and tropical waters among the Pacific, Atlantic and Indian oceans. The top siting spots were Taiwan, Japan, and the Philippines.

References

Shark genera
Megachasmidae
Fish genera with one living species